Lost John Dean is the second album by the trio, Kieran Kane, Kevin Welch & Fats Kaplin. Hal Horowitz of AllMusic writes "The recording is clean, clear and crisp, with each instrument defined under the vocals making a good album even better."

Track listing

Musicians
Kieran Kane: Vocals, guitar, octave mandolin, banjo, tambourine, drum and drum sounds
Kevin Welch: Vocals, guitar, assorted groove slaps
Fats Kaplin: Accordion, button accordion, pedal steel, oud, fiddle, electric guitar, takeoff guitar
Design: Dave Laing
Mastered by Philip Scoggins
Recorded and mixed by Charles Yingling, Philip Scoggins

All track information and credits were taken from the CD liner notes.

References

External links
Kevin Welch Official Site
Dead Reckoning Records Official Site

2006 albums
Dead Reckoning Records albums
Kevin Welch albums
Kieran Kane albums
Fats Kaplin albums